Anthony Fok is a Singaporean private tutor.

Biography 
In 2004, Fok started a tuition center, Xue Hai Tutorial Centre, later renamed as Little Professors Education Group, during his undergraduate days in Nanyang Technological University (NTU) and expanded the business to more than 15 branches in Singapore. After graduation from NTU with a degree in accountancy and economics in 2007, Fok sold off the tuition center to his partner.

Fok then worked at a Big 4 accounting firm but left after five months. He then joined the Ministry of Education to become a school teacher, teaching Economics, Principles of Accounts and Business Studies. He subsequently obtained his Masters of Education from Monash University, Australia.

In 2012, Fok left the teaching career to pursue a PhD at the National Institute of Education. While studying, Fok set up another tuition centre, JCEconomics.com, specialising in teaching in A-level economics.

In 2016, several media stories included Fok in a list of 'super tutors' who could obtain high incomes for conducting private tuition. 

In 2017, several tutors including Fok founded the Association of Tutors (Singapore) and Fok held the role of president in 2017. Fok is also a board member of Association of Person with Special Needs, a charity organization with runs special education programmers for special needs students. On 6 October 2022, Fok was elected to the board of Singapore Disability Sports Council.

In 2021, Fok sued rival tutor Edmund Quek for defamation and received S$170,000 in damages.

References 

Living people
Year of birth missing (living people)
Singaporean economists
Nanyang Technological University alumni
21st-century economists
Monash University alumni
Economics educators